Max Richter (born 22 March 1966) is a German-born British composer and pianist. He works within postminimalist and contemporary classical styles. Richter is classically trained, having graduated in composition from the University of Edinburgh, the Royal Academy of Music in London, and studied with Luciano Berio in Italy.

Richter arranges, performs, and composes music for stage, opera, ballet and screen. He has collaborated with other musicians, as well as with performance, installation and media artists. He has recorded eight solo albums, and his music is widely used in cinema, such as the score of Ari Folman's animated war film Waltz with Bashir (2008).

As of December 2019, Richter has passed one billion streams and one million album sales.

Early life and career
Richter was born in Hamelin, Lower Saxony, West Germany. He grew up in Bedford, England, United Kingdom, and his education was at Bedford Modern School and Mander College of Further Education. He studied composition and piano at the University of Edinburgh, the Royal Academy of Music, and with Luciano Berio in Florence. After finishing his studies, Richter co-founded the contemporary classical ensemble Piano Circus. He stayed with the group for ten years, commissioning and performing works by minimalist musicians such as Arvo Pärt, Brian Eno, Philip Glass, Julia Wolfe, and Steve Reich. The ensemble was signed to Decca/Argo, producing five albums.

In 1996, Richter collaborated with Future Sound of London on their album Dead Cities, beginning as a pianist, but ultimately working on several tracks, as well as co-writing one track (titled Max). Richter worked with the band for two years, also contributing to the albums The Isness and The Peppermint Tree and Seeds of Superconsciousness. In 2000, Richter worked with Mercury Prize winner Roni Size on the Reprazent album In the Møde. Richter produced Vashti Bunyan's 2005 album Lookaftering and Kelli Ali's 2008 album Rocking Horse.

Solo work
Richter's solo albums include:

Memoryhouse (2002)
Reviewed by Andy Gill as "a landmark work of contemporary classical music", Max Richter's solo debut Memoryhouse, an experimental album of "documentary music" recorded with the BBC Philharmonic Orchestra, explores real and imaginary stories and histories. Several of the tracks, such as "Sarajevo", "November", "Arbenita", and "Last Days", deal with the aftermath of the Kosovo conflict, while others are of childhood memories (e.g. "Laika's Journey"). The music combines ambient sounds, voices (including that of John Cage), and poetry readings from the work of Marina Tsvetaeva. BBC Music described the album as "a masterpiece in neoclassical composition." Memoryhouse was first played live by Richter at the Barbican Centre on 24 January 2014 to coincide with a vinyl re-release of the album.

Pitchfork gave the re-release an 8.7 rating, commenting on its extensive influence:In 2002, Richter’s ability to weave subtle electronics against the grand BBC Philharmonic Orchestra helped suggest new possibilities and locate fresh audiences that composers such as Nico Muhly and Michał Jacaszek have since pursued. As you listen to new work by Julianna Barwick or Jóhann Jóhannsson, thank Richter; just as Sigur Rós did with its widescreen rock, Richter showed that crossover wasn't necessarily an artistic curse.

The Blue Notebooks (2004)
Chosen by The Guardian as one of the best classical works of the century, The Blue Notebooks, released in 2004, featured the actress Tilda Swinton reading from Kafka's The Blue Octavo Notebooks and the work of Czesław Miłosz. Richter has stated that The Blue Notebooks is a protest album about the Iraq War, as well as a meditation on his own troubled childhood. Pitchfork described the album as "Not only one of the finest record of the last six months, but one of the most affecting and universal contemporary classical records in recent memory." To mark the 10th anniversary of its release, Richter created a track-by-track commentary for Drowned in Sound, in which he described the album as a series of interconnected dreams and an exploration of the chasm between lived experience and imagination. The second track, "On the Nature of Daylight", is used in both the opening and closing sequences of the sci-fi film Arrival, and the soundtrack for Martin Scorsese's Shutter Island. It is also used in episode 3 of HBO series "The Last of Us".

On the eve of its 2018 re-issue, marking the 15th anniversary of its release, Fact named the album "one of the most iconic pieces of classical and protest music of the 21st century." The re-release included a new cover design and several new tracks that were originally composed for the project. Richter also released another single, "Cypher", which is an 8 minutes classical-electronic track based upon the theme of "On the Nature of Daylight".

Songs from Before (2006)
In 2006, he released his third solo album, Songs from Before, which features Robert Wyatt reading texts by Haruki Murakami.

24 Postcards in Full Colour (2008)
Richter released his fourth solo album 24 Postcards in Full Colour, a collection of 24 classically composed miniatures for ringtones, in 2008. The pieces are a series of variations on the basic material, scored for strings, piano, and electronics.

Discussing the album with NPR Classical in 2017  Richter stated "People were downloading ringtones at the time and I felt this was a missed opportunity for composers. That there was a space opening up, maybe a billion little loudspeakers walking around the planet, but nobody was really thinking of this as a space for creative music. So I set out to make these tiny little fragments and then, of course, in the poetic sense, the idea of these little sound carrying objects traversing the planet, I started to think of these as a connection, as a sort of postcard into somebody's life, into their space."

Infra (2010)
Richter's 2010 album Infra takes as its central theme the 2005 terrorist bombings in London, and is an extension of his 25-minute score for a ballet of the same name choreographed by Wayne McGregor and staged at the Royal Opera House. Infra comprises music written for piano, electronics and string quintet, plus the full performance score and material that subsequently developed from the construction of the album.
Pitchfork described the album as "achingly gorgeous" and The Independent newspaper characterised it as "a journey in 13 episodes, emerging from a blur of static and finding its way in a repeated phrase that grows in loveliness."

Recomposed by Max Richter: Vivaldi – The Four Seasons (2012)
Richter's recomposed version of Vivaldi's The Four Seasons, Recomposed by Max Richter: Vivaldi – The Four Seasons, was premiered in the UK at the Barbican Centre on 31 October 2012, performed by the Britten Sinfonia, conducted by André de Ridder and with violinist Daniel Hope. Although Richter said that he had discarded 75% of Vivaldi's original material, the parts he does use are phased and looped, emphasising his grounding in postmodern and minimalist music. The album topped the iTunes classical chart in the UK, Germany and the US. The US launch concert in New York at Le Poisson Rouge was recorded by NPR and streamed.

Sleep and  From Sleep (2015)
In 2015, Richter released his most ambitious project to date, a collaboration with visual artist, and creative partner, Yulia Mahr, titled Sleep, an 8.5 hour listening experience targeted to fit a full night's rest. The album itself contains 31 compositions, most of them reaching 20–30 minutes in duration, all based around variations of 4-5 themes. The music is calm, slow, mellow and composed for piano, cello, two violas, two violins, organ, soprano vocals, synthesisers and electronics. Strings are played by the American Contemporary Music Ensemble (Ben Russell, Yuki Numata Resnik, Caleb Burhans, Clarice Jensen and Brian Snow), vocals are by Grace Davidson, and the piano, synthesisers and electronics are played by Richter himself.

Richter also released a 1-hour version of the project, From Sleep, that contains roughly 1 shortened version of every "theme" from Sleep (hence its title), and is supposed to act as a shorter listening experience for the Sleep project.

Richter has described Sleep as an eight-hour-long lullaby. It was released on CD and vinyl. The work was strongly influenced by Gustav Mahler's symphonic works.

The entire composition was performed on 27 September 2015, from midnight to 8:00 A.M. as the climax of the "Science and Music" weekend on BBC Radio 3. The performance broke several records, including the longest live broadcast of a single musical composition in the history of the network.

Sleep was chosen by Jarvis Cocker to be the BBC Radio 6 Album of the year for 2015 and by Pitchfork as one of the 50 best ambient albums of all time.

The full-length Sleep has been played live by Richter at the Concertgebouw (Grote Zaal) Amsterdam; the Sydney Opera House; in Berlin (as part of Berliner Festspiele's Maerz Musik Festival), in Madrid (as part of Veranos de la Villa) and in London (at the Barbican). In November 2017,  Sleep was played at the Philharmonie de Paris.

Sleep was performed for its first outdoor performance and largest performance to-date in Los Angeles, CA on 27–28 July and 28–29 July 2018. The performance took place in Grand Park, opposite Los Angeles Music Center.  Each performance had 560 beds and was timed so the final movement, "Dream 0 (till break of day)" would occur at dawn.  Richter played with members of the American Contemporary Music Ensemble.

In September 2018 it was played in the Antwerp cathedral for an audience of 400 which were provided with beds for the night. In August 2019 it was performed in Helsinki, as part of the Helsinki Festival, in the tent arena, with half the audience in two-person tents.

"I think of it as a piece of protest music," Richter has said. "It’s protest music against this sort of very super industrialised, intense, mechanised way of living right now. It’s a political work in that sense. It’s a call to arms to stop what we’re doing.

Three Worlds: Music from Woolf Works (2017)
Three Worlds: Music From Woolf Works is Max Richter’s eighth album, released in January 2017. The music is taken from the score Richter composed for the ballet Woolf Works in collaboration with choreographer Wayne McGregor at the Royal Opera House in London, which follows a three-part structure offering evocations of three books by Virginia Woolf (Mrs Dalloway, Orlando, and The Waves). The album features classical and electronic sound as well as an original voice recording of Woolf herself.

Voices (2020)
Richter's Voices project, a collaboration with visual artist Yulia Mahr, is inspired by the Universal Declaration of Human Rights and features an  'upside down' orchestra, a concept he developed to reflect his dismay of post-truth politics in the 21st century. The album contains readings of the declaration by Eleanor Roosevelt and actress Kiki Layne, with a further 70 readings crowd-sourced from around the world.

The accompanying music videos by Yulia Mahr dealt with the artist's own experiences of migration. The video 'Mercy' won a Bafta.

The opening piece on the album was played by Yo-Yo Ma at his concert "A New Equilibrium" honouring the 75th anniversary of the UN's creation.

Exiles (2021)

On 6 August 2021, the new album Exiles was released. The album was recorded in 2019, in Tallinn, the capital of Estonia, with the collaboration of a conductor Kristjan Järvi and the Baltic Sea Philharmonic. The  Exiles also includes extended versions of previously released works such as "The Haunted Ocean", "Infra 5", "Flowers Of Herself", "On The Nature Of Daylight" and "Sunlight". Max Richter describes the Exile album as a serious work because of its theme of the subject, which has an emotional texture.

Film and television work
Richter has created numerous film and television soundtracks over the years. He rose to prominence with his score to Ari Folman's Golden Globe-winning film Waltz with Bashir in 2007, in which he supplanted a standard orchestral soundtrack with synth-based sounds and winning him the European Film Award for Best Composer. He also scored the independent feature film Henry May Long, starring Randy Sharp and Brian Barnhart, in 2008, and wrote the music for Feo Aladag's film Die Fremde (with additional music by Stéphane Moucha).

In 2010, Dinah Washington's "This Bitter Earth" was remixed with Richter's "On the Nature of Daylight" for the Martin Scorsese film Shutter Island. In July 2010, "On the Nature of Daylight" and "Vladimir's Blues" were featured throughout the BBC Two two-part drama Dive, which was co-written by BAFTA-winning Dominic Savage and Simon Stevens. "On the Nature of Daylight" was also featured in an episode of HBO's television series Luck. Four tracks—"Europe, After the Rain", "The Twins (Prague)", "Fragment", and "Embers"—were used in the six-part 2005 BBC documentary Auschwitz: The Nazis and the Final Solution produced by Laurence Rees. Richter also wrote the soundtrack to Peter Richardson's documentary, How to Die in Oregon, and the score to Impardonnables (2011) directed by André Téchiné.

An excerpt of the song "Sarajevo" from his 2002 album Memoryhouse was used in the international trailer for the Ridley Scott film Prometheus. The track "November", from the same album, was featured in the international trailer for Terrence Malick's 2012 film, To the Wonder, and in the trailer for Clint Eastwood's 2011 film, J. Edgar. Films featuring Richter's music released in 2011 include French drama Sarah's Key by Gilles Paquet-Brenner and David MacKenzie's romantic thriller Perfect Sense. In 2012 he composed the scores for Henry Alex Rubin's Disconnect and Cate Shortland's Australian-German war thriller Lore. Richter again collaborated with Folman on The Congress, which was released in 2013.

Richter composed the original soundtrack for the HBO series The Leftovers, created by Damon Lindelof and Tom Perrotta, which was premiered in June 2014. Some of these compositions are included in the albums Memoryhouse and The Blue Notebooks. He also composed the score for the WW1 feature film Testament of Youth in 2014.

In 2016, Richter composed the score to "Nosedive", an episode of Charlie Brooker's Black Mirror. Also that year, he scored Luke Scott's debut feature Morgan and the political thriller Miss Sloane, while his piece "On the Nature of Daylight" opened and closed Denis Villeneuve's film Arrival. "On the Nature Of Daylight" also closes episode 7 of Castle Rock, "The Queen". He composed all the music in BBC One's drama Taboo which was broadcast in January and February 2017.

In 2017, The Current War used Richter's "Spring 1".

In 2017, documentary film maker Nancy Buirski used the track combining Dinah Washington's "This Bitter Earth" with Richter's "On The Nature of Daylight", first heard in Shutter Island, in her film The Rape of Recy Taylor.

In December 2017, an excerpt of Recomposed by Max Richter: Vivaldi – The Four Seasons was used in The Crown season 2 as the theme for Princess Margaret's (Vanessa Kirby) turbulent courtship with photographer Anthony Armstrong-Jones (Matthew Goode).

In 2018, Richter composed music for the films Hostiles by Scott Cooper starring Christian Bale and Rosamund Pike, White Boy Rick starring Matthew McConaughey, the German film Never Look Away, and Mary Queen of Scots starring Saoirse Ronan and Margot Robbie. He also composed music for the mini-series My Brilliant Friend on HBO.

In 2019, Richter scored the film Ad Astra starring Brad Pitt with additional music by Nils Frahm and Lorne Balfe. An excerpt of his rendition of Dona nobis pacem was used for the fifth season of the BBC series Peaky Blinders created by Steven Knight.

In 2021, his piece "On The Nature of Daylight" was, yet again, used in a TV show The Handmaid's Tale for a scene in season 4, episode 9. Interestingly, three years earlier Elisabeth Moss, the lead actress of the show, starred in Richter's music video of the same piece. As a director of the episode, as well as the star, Moss specifically chose the piece.

In October 2021, Richter composed the original score for the Apple TV series Invasion.

In 2023 the track "On The Nature of Daylight" was featured in the third episode of the HBO series The Last of Us

Ballet, opera and stage works
Richter wrote the score to Infra as part of a Royal Ballet-commissioned collaboration with choreographer Wayne McGregor and artist Julian Opie. The production was staged at the Royal Opera House in London in 2008. In 2011, Richter composed a chamber opera based on neuroscientist David Eagleman's book Sum: Forty Tales from the Afterlives. The opera was choreographed by Wayne McGregor and premiered at the Royal Opera House Linbury Studio Theatre in 2012. The piece received positive reviews, with London's Evening Standard saying "[it] fits together rather beautifully". Their collaboration continued in April 2014 with Wayne McGregor's 'Kairos'; a ballet set to Richter's recomposition of the Four Seasons and part of a collaborative program involving three different choreographers titled 'Notations' with Ballett Zürich. In 2015 Richter and McGregor collaborated again on a new full-length ballet, Woolf Works, inspired by three novels by Virginia Woolf.

Crystal Pite has also choreographed a ballet to Richter's Vivaldi Recomposed, titled The Seasons' Canon, which premiered at the Opera National de Paris in 2016. Sol Leon and Paul Lightfoot choreographed a piece to Richter's "Exiles" for the Nederlands Dans Theater.

In 2012/13, Richter contributed music to The National Theatre of Scotland's production of Macbeth, starring Alan Cumming. The play opened at New York's Lincoln Centre and subsequently moved to Broadway. The company had previously used Richter's "Last Days" in their acclaimed production of Black Watch.

Richter was called upon again by past collaborator Wayne McGregor to score and produce an adaptation of Margaret Atwood's MaddAddam trilogy commissioned by the National Ballet of Canada and The Royal Ballet in 2022, wherein his orchestral and electronically produced compositions, both alone and together, help to realize Atwood's dystopian vision.

Other collaborations
In 2010, Richter's soundscape The Anthropocene formed part of Darren Almond's film installation at the White Cube gallery in London. The composer has also collaborated with digital art collective Random International on two projects, contributing scores to the installations Future Self (2012), staged at the MADE space in Berlin, and Rain Room (2012/13) at London's Barbican Centre and MOMA, in New York.

Personal life
Max Richter lives in Oxfordshire with his partner, the visual artist Yulia Mahr, two black Labradors called Haku and Evie, and a cat called Kiki. They have previously lived in Edinburgh and Berlin.

Solo discography

Studio albums

Scores

Awards and nominations

See also
List of postminimalist composers
Music and sleep

References

External links
 
 
 Review of Infra in Tokafi Magazine
 Review of Infra in Nowness magazine
 Max Richter is a Composer Dumbo Feather magazine, 2012

21st-century classical composers
Animation composers
European Film Award for Best Composer winners
Postminimalist composers
Experimental composers
English film score composers
English male film score composers
German film score composers
German male composers
English contemporary pianists
German pianists
German emigrants to England
1966 births
Deutsche Grammophon artists
Living people
Alumni of the University of Edinburgh
People educated at Bedford Modern School
20th-century German musicians
20th-century English composers
People from Bedford
People from Hamelin
English male composers
21st-century German composers
British male pianists
21st-century pianists
20th-century British male musicians
21st-century British male musicians
FatCat Records artists